Macrobrachium formosense, the crane river prawn, is a species of freshwater shrimp in the family Palaemonidae. It lives in streams and rivers in Taiwan and southern Japan, including the Ryukyu Islands.

References

Palaemonidae
Freshwater crustaceans of Asia
Crustaceans described in 1868
Crustaceans of Japan
Arthropods of Taiwan